Liquid Liquid is the debut EP by Liquid Liquid. It was released in 1981, through the record label 99.

Background 

"New Walk", "Lub Dupe" and "Bell Head" were recorded live at Hurrahs in New York City on February 13, 1981 and were produced by Ed Bahlman. The other two tracks were recorded at Man Made Studios, and were produced by Liquid Liquid themselves along with Bahlman and Bruce Tovsky on the final track, "Rubbermiro".

Track listing

Critical reception 

Trouser Press classified the EP as "impressive".

Personnel 

 Liquid Liquid

 Salvatore Principato – vocals, percussion
 Richard McGuire – bass guitar, percussion, guitar, melodica, cover design, production ("Groupmegroup", "Rubbermiro")
 Bill Kleinsmith – congas, production ("Groupmegroup", "Rubbermiro")
 Scott Hartley – drums, percussion, production  ("Groupmegroup", "Rubbermiro")
 Dennis Young – marimba, percussion, production  ("Groupmegroup", "Rubbermiro")
 Al Diaz – percussion
 R. Edson (Richard Edson) – trumpet

 Technical

 Ed Kahlman – production ("New Walk", "Lub Dupe", "Bell Head")
 Bruce Tovsky – production ("Rubbermiro")
 HW (Howie Weinberg) – mastering

References

External links 
 

1981 debut EPs
Liquid Liquid EPs
99 Records EPs